The 2018–19 Texas–Rio Grande Valley Vaqueros men's basketball team represented the University of Texas Rio Grande Valley during the 2018–19 NCAA Division I men's basketball season. The Vaqueros, led by third-year head coach Lew Hill, played their home games at the UTRGV Fieldhouse, with one home game at Bert Ogden Arena, as members of the Western Athletic Conference. With their win on February 28, the Vaqueros clinched a winning regular season record for the first time since the 2007–08 season. They finished the season 20–17, 9–7 in WAC play to finish in fourth place. They defeated Cal State Bakersfield in the quarterfinals of the WAC tournament before losing in the semifinals to New Mexico State. They were invited to the CollegeInsider.com Tournament where they defeated Grambling State in the first round before losing in the second round to Texas Southern.

Previous season
They finished the 2017–18 season 15–18, 6–8 in WAC play to finish in fifth place. They lost in the quarterfinals of the WAC tournament to Seattle. They were invited to the College Basketball Invitational where they lost in the first round to New Orleans.

Roster

Schedule and results
The Vaqueros's schedule was released on August 7, 2018. The team played a two-game foreign exhibition series in Costa Rica in August.

|-
!colspan=9 style=| Costa Rica Foreign Tour

|-
!colspan=9 style=| Regular season

|-
!colspan=9 style=| <span style=>WAC tournament

|-
!colspan=12 style=| CollegeInsider.com Postseason tournament
|-

See also 
 2018–19 Texas–Rio Grande Valley Vaqueros women's basketball team

References 

UT Rio Grande Valley Vaqueros men's basketball seasons
Texas-Rio Grande
Texas-Rio Grande